The 4th European Cross Country Championships were held at Oeiras in Portugal on 14 December 1997. Danish orienteer Carsten Jørgensen took the title in the men's competition and Joalsiae Llado won the women's race.

Results

Men individual 10km

83 runners finished.

Men teams

Total 15 teams

Women individual 5km

55 runners finished.

Women teams

Total 11 teams

Junior men individual 5km

58 runners finished.

Juniors men teams

Total 12 teams

Junior women individual 3km

58 runners finished.

Junior women teams

References

External links 
 Database containing all results between 1994–2007

European Cross Country Championships
European Cross Country Championships
European Cross Country Championships
Sport in Oeiras, Portugal
International athletics competitions hosted by Portugal
Cross country running in Portugal
European Cross Country Championships